Lowry Hill is a neighborhood within the Calhoun-Isles community in Minneapolis, Minnesota. The neighborhood is regarded as being one of the city’s most upscale and wealthy neighborhoods. It was historically the home of Minneapolis’s most prominent milling and lumber families. 

The neighborhood is named for the terminal moraine on which it sits, a hill named after late nineteenth century real estate mogul and trolley tycoon Thomas Lowry. Although secluded by trees and parkways up on the hill, its boundaries are Interstate 394 to the north, Interstate 94 to the east, Hennepin Avenue to the southeast, West 22nd Street to the south, Lake of the Isles Parkway to the southwest, and Logan Avenue South and Morgan Avenue South to the west. Lowry Hill is northwest of Lowry Hill East; the two neighborhoods are separated by Hennepin Avenue.

The hill was described as swampy and covered in a thick old-growth forest during Minneapolis’s early years. The hill eventually became a small farming area overlooking Minneapolis in the mid 1800s. 

Many houses in Lowry Hill were built in the Victorian style before 1900.  However, the Colonial, Mediterranean, English Tudor, Richardsonian Romanesque, Rambler, and Prairie style make appearances as well.  A majority of those homes were constructed shortly after the neighborhood's establishment as a preferred residential area for many of the wealthiest of Minneapolis' citizens.  In over 100 years, the look of Lowry Hill has remained almost unchanged, however, some of the large homes built by original owners have been converted to condominia.

References

External links 
 Minneapolis Neighborhood Profile - Lowry Hill

See also 
 Lowry Hill Tunnel
 Virginia Triangle

Neighborhoods in Minneapolis